The Uniform Trade Secrets Act (UTSA), published by the Uniform Law Commission (ULC) in 1979 and amended in 1985, is a Uniform Act promulgated for adoption by states in the United States. One goal of the UTSA is to make the state laws governing trade secrets uniform, which is especially important for companies that operate in more than one state. Historically, the law governing misappropriation of trade secrets developed separately in each state.

Of course, achieving the goal of uniformity depends upon the number of states that choose to adopt it. , the UTSA has been enacted by 48 states, the District of Columbia, Puerto Rico, and the U.S. Virgin Islands. As with other Uniform Acts, some states have modified language in their version of the statute.

Motivation
A prefatory note to the UTSA states some original motivations for the act:

The UTSA made note of the commercial value and competitive advantages inherent in trade secrets.  Unlike patent protection, which was addressed at the federal level, trade secret misappropriation was addressed at the state level.

In the United States there existed a prevalence of interstate commercial transactions that extended beyond the jurisdiction of individual state legislation.  For example, goods may have been manufactured in State A, warehoused in State B, sold from State C, and delivered in State D.

As a result, the UTSA sought to alleviate the uneven development and "uncertainty concerning the parameters of trade secret protection" by recommending a uniform trade secret law and, at the same time, allowing the states the flexibility to meet local circumstances by modifying the text as enacted in each state.

In addition to providing some recourse for any uncertainty associated with a patent, the UTSA also serves to codify the common law remedies that have emerged in many states. These remedies are based on legal precedent set by previous cases, and therefore allow for greater uncertainty, particularly in less industrial states where there have been fewer trade secret cases.

The UTSA notes that any confusion caused by having strictly common law remedies to trade secret misappropriation was exacerbated by omitting trade secret rules from the second edition of the Restatement of Torts.

Overview
The UTSA contained a prefatory note followed by 12 sections of proposed law. Each section was followed by a "comments" section that provided clarifications and examples as to the intent of the law. Section 1 presented definitions of key terms as they are used throughout the act. Sections 2–4 provided remedies for potential wrongs committed in violation of the act, including injunctive relief, damages and attorney's fees. Sections 5–12 made additional provisions related to the implementation of the law, and the relationship to other laws.

Key definitions
The UTSA provided several definitions of terms as they are used throughout the act.  Some of these definitions are replicated here for the benefit of the reader.

Although not included in the definition itself, the original text of the UTSA provided clarification regarding the definition of proper and improper means. The comments refined the definition by listing several proper means of discovery, including discovery by independent invention, reverse engineering, licensing arrangement, and published literature. The comments also clarified that improper means included actions that were, "improper under the circumstances; e.g., an airplane overflight used as aerial reconnaissance to determine the competitor's plant layout during construction of the plant".

The UTSA noted that the types of accidents or mistakes that would lead to use of a learned trade secret being misappropriated did not include actions or mistakes that "constitute a failure of efforts that are reasonable under circumstances to maintain its [the trade secret's] secrecy".

The UTSA also provided refinement through comments to the definition of a trade secret itself:
Multiple parties may hold rights to the same trade secret, as they may all individually derive value from it.
A trade secret ceases to exist when it is common knowledge within the community in which it is profitable. This means that the secret does not need to be known by the general public, but only throughout the industry that stands to profit from it.
A party that reverse engineers a trade secret may also obtain trade secret protection for their knowledge, provided the reverse engineering process is non-trivial.
Knowledge preventing loss of funds, such as that a particular idea does not work, is valuable and as such qualifies for trade secret protection.
Regarding reasonable efforts to maintain secrecy, the UTSA maintained that actions such as restricting access to a "need-to-know basis" and informing employees that the information is secret met the criteria for reasonable efforts. The UTSA stated that the courts do not require procedures to protect against "flagrant industrial espionage" were not necessary.

Remedies
The UTSA provided for several potential remedies for wrongs committed under the act, including injunctive relief, damages, and attorney's fees.

Injunctive relief
Section 2 of the UTSA provided for injunctive relief from trade secret misappropriation. Section 2(a) stipulated, "Actual or threatened misappropriation may be enjoined". However, the length of the injunction was limited to the length of time the trade secret exists (i.e., remains unknown to some party who could profit from knowing the secret) plus sufficient time to eliminate any competitive advantage that could have been obtained by misappropriation of the trade secret.

In addition to the possible enjoinment described in section 2(a), section 2(b) allowed for the payment of reasonable royalties in place of an injunction under exceptional circumstances. The UTSA, in the comments for section 2, referenced a court case in which a misappropriated trade secret was used to build military technology for use during the Vietnam War. As an injunction may have prevented necessary equipment from reaching U.S. armed forces, the judge ordered that the misappropriator pay an appropriate royalty to the trade secret owner rather than imposing an injunction.

Damages
In addition to injunctive relief offered under the UTSA, parties may also receive damages. Section 3(a) states that, "Damages can include both the actual loss caused by misappropriation and the unjust enrichment caused by misappropriation that is not taken into account in computing actual loss". Furthermore, the act stated in section 3(b) that if misappropriation is, "willful and malicious" the court may award damages up to twice what would otherwise be entitled under section 3(a). Restrictions similar to those imposed on the duration of injunctive relief are imposed on the duration of damages as well.

Attorney's fees
Section 4 of the UTSA stipulated that the court may award attorney's fees to the prevailing party for actions made in "bad faith or willful and malicious misappropriation".

Other provisions
Section 5 provided for the "preservation of secrecy"; namely that a court should take reasonable means to protect a trade secret during any legal action concerning the trade secret.  These secretive measures can include sealing records and gag orders.
Section 6 provided a statute of limitations, requiring that any action under the UTSA must be "brought within 3 years after the misappropriation is discovered or by the exercise of reasonable diligence should have been discovered".
Section 7 stated that the UTSA superseded any existing "... tort, restitutionary, and other law of this State providing civil remedies for misappropriation of a trade secret". The section also made clear that the UTSA did not affect (1) contractual remedies, (2) civil remedies not based on trade secret misappropriation, or (3) criminal remedies, which may otherwise be of use to the aggrieved party.
Section 8 stated the goal of making trade secret law uniform among states enacting the UTSA.
Section 9 provided a short title to refer to the act and section 10 described the severability of the act.
Sections 11 and 12 provided a date when the act took effect and the opportunity to explicitly list other acts to be repealed.

Adoption by U.S. states
, the UTSA has been adopted by all states except New York and North Carolina (but its law is very similar and seems to borrow heavily from the act ). On May 2, 2013, Texas enacted Senate Bill 953, becoming the 47th state to adopt the UTSA. The Texas statute took effect on September 1, 2013.

Massachusetts adopted the Uniform Trade Secrets Act effective October 1, 2018.

The UTSA has also been adopted in the District of Columbia, Puerto Rico, and the U.S. Virgin Islands. States are not required to pass the act exactly as is, and some have made amendments.

Notable cases
The following cases have directly referenced the UTSA:
Rivendell Forest Prods. v. Georgia-Pacific Corp. (10th Cir. 1994)
Comprehensive Techs. Int'l v. Software Artisans, Inc. (4th Cir. 1993)
DVD Copy Control Association v. Bunner (Cal. App. 1994)
Ajaxo v. E*Trade Financial Corp. (Cal. App. 2010)
Silvaco Data Systems v. Intel Corp. (Cal. App. 2010)
R.C. Olmstead, Inc. v. CU Interface (N.D. Ohio 2009)
Justmed v. Byce (9th Cir. 2010)
Decision Insights, Inc. v. Sentia Group, Inc. (4th Cir. 2011)
Cypress Semiconductor Corp. v. Superior Court (Cal. App. 2008)
NCR v. Warner (S.D. Ohio 2008)
Othentec v. Phelan (4th Cir. 2008)
Southern Nuclear Operating Co. v. Elec. Data Sys. Corp. (11th Cir. 2008)

International application

Trade secret law varies more from country to country.

The North American Free Trade Agreement (NAFTA) has provisions providing for uniform minimum standards for protecting trade secrets.

Trade Secrets in Europe are dealt with on a country-by-country basis. In England and Wales, trade secret protection is predicated upon the common law concept of "breach of confidence"—i.e., regardless of the existence of a contract, those who obtain the trade secret in confidence shall not take unfair advantage of it without consent.

Germany's Act Against Unfair Competition states, "any person who, in the course of business activity for purposes of competition, commits acts contrary to honest practices" and hold violators responsible for damages.

See also
 Defend Trade Secrets Act
 Economic Espionage Act of 1996
 Glossary of legal terms in technology
 Biswamohan Pani, charged in 2008 with stealing $1 billion worth of trade secrets from Intel
 Data General Corp. v. Digital Computer Controls, Inc. addressing secrecy given widespread disclosure
 Non-disclosure agreement
 PhoneDog v. Kravitz addressing whether social media accounts could constitute trade secrets
 Trade secret
 The Case for a Federal Trade Secrets Act 
 Ajaxo Inc. v. E*Trade Financial Corp.

References

External links 
 

United States intellectual property law
Secrecy
Trade secrets
Trade secrets